James Renwick Jr. (born November 11, 1818, Bloomingdale, in Upper Manhattan, New York City – June 23, 1895, New York City) was an American architect in the 19th century. The Encyclopedia of American Architecture calls him "one of the most successful American architects of his time".

Life and work
Renwick was born into a wealthy and well-educated family. His mother, Margaret Brevoort, was from a wealthy and socially prominent New York family. His father, James Renwick, was an engineer, architect, and professor of natural philosophy at Columbia College, now Columbia University. His two brothers were also engineers.  
Renwick is buried in Green-Wood Cemetery in Brooklyn, New York, with his wife and father.

Renwick was not formally trained as an architect. His ability and interest in building design were nurtured through his cultivated background, which granted him early exposure to travel, and through a broad cultural education that included architectural history. He learned the skills from his father. He studied engineering at Columbia, entering at age twelve and graduating in 1836. He received an M.A. three years later. On graduating, he took a position as structural engineer with the Erie Railroad and subsequently served as supervisor on the Croton Reservoir, acting as an assistant engineer on the Croton Aqueduct in New York City.

Renwick received his first major commission, at the age of twenty-five, in 1843 when he won the competition to design Grace Church, an Episcopal church in New York City, which was executed in the English Gothic style. In 1846, Renwick won the competition for the design of the Smithsonian Institution Building in Washington, DC. Built between 1847 and 1855, the many-turreted building, generally referred to as "the Castle," was designed in the Romanesque style, as requested by the Board of Regents of the Smithsonian, and was built of red sandstone quarried at the Seneca Quarry in Seneca, Maryland. It was a major influence in the Gothic revival in the United States.

In 1849, Renwick designed the Free Academy Building (City College of New York), New York City, at Lexington Avenue and 23rd Street. It was one of the first Gothic Revival college buildings on the East Coast.

Renwick went on to design what is considered his finest achievement, and his best-known building, St. Patrick's Cathedral, on the corner of Fifth Avenue and 51st Street. He was chosen as architect for the Roman Catholic cathedral in 1853, construction began in 1858, and the cathedral opened in May 1879. The cathedral is the most ambitious essay in Gothic that the revival of the style produced and is a mixture of German, French, and English Gothic influences.

Another of the prominent buildings Renwick designed was the Corcoran Gallery of Art (now home to the Smithsonian's Renwick Gallery), in the Second Empire style, in Washington D.C. (1859–1871). Other commissions included the first major buildings on the campus of Vassar College in Poughkeepsie, New York (1861–1865), including the Main Hall (1860); Saint Bartholomew's Church (1871–1872) at Madison Avenue and 44th Street in New York City (now demolished); All Saints' Roman Catholic Church (1882–1893) in Harlem in the Victorian Gothic style; and many mansions for the wealthy of the area, including the Peter Aims-Aimes house, "Martinstow", in West Haven, Connecticut. Renwick is revered in Ipswich, Massachusetts, as the architect who designed Ascension Memorial Church, whose cornerstone was laid in October 1869.

Renwick also designed the first chapter house of St. Anthony Hall/Delta Psi, the secret fraternal college society which was founded at Columbia University in 1847.  Even though the 1879 structure at 29 East 28th Street is marred now by a street level storefront, in 1990 Christopher Gray wrote in the New York Times that "Old photographs show a high stoop arrangement with the figure of an owl on the peaked roof and a plaque with the Greek letters Delta Psi over the windowless chapter room. In 1879, The New York Tribune called it French Renaissance, but the stumpy pilasters and blocky detailing suggest the Neo-Grec style then near the end of its popularity." In 1899 the fraternity moved to a new chapter house on Riverside Drive and for a few years the original building was kept as a clubhouse for graduate members.  At that time a newspaper account described it as a "perfect Bijou of tasteful decoration".

Among his other designs were banks; the Charity and Smallpox Hospitals on Roosevelt Island; the main building of the Children's Hospital on Randall's Island; the Inebriate and Lunatic Asylums on Wards Island and the former facade of the New York Stock Exchange. Renwick was also supervising architect for the Commission of Charities and Correction. A small group of Renwick's architectural drawings and papers are held by the Avery Architectural and Fine Arts Library at Columbia University.

Renwick was also the designer of the bell tower of the Cathedral Basilica of St. Augustine, Florida. The work was commissioned by Standard Oil partner Henry M. Flagler who was building luxury hotels in the historic city at the time.  Renwick and his wife Anna Aspinwall lived and owned property in the lighthouse area of St. Augustine on Anastasia Island. In the Spring of 1890, Renwick listened to Franklin W. Smith deliver a speech to garner support for his Design and Prospectus for a National Gallery of History of Art at Washington.  Renwick endorsed the idea and offered to provide drawings, plans and illustrations for the project. Smith gratefully accepted and the firm of Renwick, Aspinwall & Russell spent six months completing their contribution.

Firm history 
In the late 1850s, already well-established, Renwick temporarily partnered with Richard T. Auchmoty.  In the 1860s and 1870s, a few of Renwick's commissions are credited as Renwick & Sands.  These indicate Renwick's short-lived partnership with architect Joseph Sands (? – 1879), and include Church of the Holy Sepulchre in NYC, 1869, and the New York City Public Charities Building (razed), at 66 Third Avenue (1868–1871).

One constant in the firm was J. Lawrence Aspinwall (1854–1936), who started to work for Renwick in 1875, practiced in the firm more than 60 years, partner from 1880 to 1925, and became an AIA Fellow in 1914.  Aspinwall was the cousin of Renwick's wife Anna.

From 1878 to 1894, the firm was known as Renwick, Aspinwall & Russell, with the partnership of William Hamilton Russell (1856–1907), Renwick's grand nephew.  Upon his graduation, Russell became a protégé of his great uncle, who designed the chapter house of Russell's fraternity, St. Anthony Hall, at 25 East 28th Street, New York in 1878, the same year Renwick completed St. Patrick's Cathedral, New York.  It is likely Russell contributed work to both his fraternity's first chapter house as well as the cathedral during his apprenticeship with Renwick.  Russell departed in 1894 to co-found Clinton & Russell.

After Renwick's death in 1895, the immediate successor organization was called Renwick, Aspinwall & Renwick, then Renwick, Aspinwall & Owen, with the addition of Walter Tallent Owen (1864-1902).  In 1904, it became known as Renwick, Aspinwall & Tucker, then Renwick, Aspinwall & Guard by the late 1920s.

Several of Renwick's employees protégés became influential architects in their own right, including:

 Bertram Grosvenor Goodhue, whose designs included the Wolf's Head Secret Society Hall at Yale, the Nebraska State Capitol building, Balboa Park (San Diego), and the chapel at West Point.  He began his apprenticeship at Renwick, Aspinwall and Russell in 1884, and his apprenticeship ended in 1891 when he won a national design competition for St. Matthew's in Dallas, Texas.  His first years with Renwick's firm partly coincided with Russell's first years, below.
 John Wellborn Root, one of the founders of the Chicago School style.

Major buildings designed
 The Reformed Church of Saugerties, 173 Main St Suagerties, NY (1852)
 Mark Twain House, 21 Fifth Avenue, NYC (c. 1842; razed 1953)
 Grace Church, New York (1843–1846)
 Smithsonian Institution Building, Washington, D.C. (1847–1855)
 Calvary Church, New York (1848)
 Free Academy Building, City College of New York, Lexington Avenue and 23rd Street, New York City (1849)
 Oak Hill Cemetery Chapel, Washington, D.C. (1850)
 Rhinelander Gardens, 110-124 West 11th Street, NYC, a three-story above raised basement row of houses (c. 1850; razed 1956)
 Trinity Episcopal Church, Washington, D.C. (1851; razed 1936)
 Municipal Courthouse, 817 Princess Anne Street, Fredericksburg, Virginia (1852)
 St. Patrick's Cathedral, New York, (1858–1879)
 Corcoran Gallery of Art (currently the Renwick Gallery), Washington, D.C. (1859–1871)
 Main Building, Vassar College, Poughkeepsie, New York (1861–1865)
 Cathedral of Our Merciful Saviour, Faribault, Minnesota (1862–1869)
 Church of St. Barnabas expansion, Irvington, New York (1863)
 St. Ann & the Holy Trinity Church, Clinton and Livingston, Brooklyn, New York (1866-1869)
 St. Mary's Episcopal Church, Foggy Bottom, Washington, DC (1867).
 Greymore Friars' Residence, NYC (1869)
 Cathedral High School, NYC (1869)
 First Presbyterian Church of Hartford, Connecticut (1870; Renwick & Sands)
 Basilica of St. John the Baptist, Canton, Ohio (1871)
 St. Bartholomew's Church, Madison Avenue and East 44th Street, NYC (1871–1872; razed)
 Second Presbyterian Church, Chicago (1872–1874)
 St. Claire's Chapel, [St. Mary Help of Christians Church, Aiken, South Carolina (1879)
 Former St. Anthony Hall Chapter House, New York (circa 1879) 
 St. Nicholas of Myra Church, East 10th Street, NYC (1882–1883)
 Demarest Building, Fifth Avenue and East 33rd Street, NYC (c. 1890)

Gallery

References
Notes

Bibliography
 Packard, Robert. (Ed.) (1995). The Encyclopedia of American Architecture (2nd ed.). New York: McGraw-Hill.

External links
 Selma Rattner research papers on James Renwick, 1856-2001 (bulk 1960s-2001) Held in the Dept. of Drawings & Archives, Avery Architectural & Fine Arts Library, Columbia University, New York City
Art and the empire city: New York, 1825-1861, an exhibition catalog from The Metropolitan Museum of Art (fully available online as PDF), which contains material on Renwick Jr. (see index)
Biography at Smithsonian Scrapbook
Biography at Columbians Ahead of Their Time
Renwick Family Letters and Manuscripts 1794-1916
 
James Renwick and James Renwick, Jr. architectural drawings and papers, circa 1813-1960, held by the Avery Architectural and Fine Arts Library, Columbia University

 
1818 births
1895 deaths
American ecclesiastical architects
American neoclassical architects
Gothic Revival architects
Architects of cathedrals
Architects of Roman Catholic churches
Architects from New York City
Smithsonian Institution people
Fellows of the American Institute of Architects
Columbia College (New York) alumni
Burials at Green-Wood Cemetery
People from Essex County, New York
Defunct architecture firms based in New York City
19th-century American architects